Niclas Pieczkowski (born 28 December 1989) is a German handball player for SC DHfK Leipzig and the German national team.

Achievements
European Championship:
: 2016

References

1989 births
Living people
German male handball players
Handball-Bundesliga players